Ratlake Meadows is a  biological Site of Special Scientific Interest north of Chandler's Ford in Hampshire.

These unimproved meadows on London Clay are recorded back to the sixteenth century and are probably much older. They are dominated by sweet vernal grass, heath grass, tufted hairgrass and Yorkshire fog, and have a rich variety of herbs. Invertebrates include the rare bush cricket, long-winged conehead.

References

 
Sites of Special Scientific Interest in Hampshire